"Oh Oh" is a song written by Guy Sebastian and Jarrad Rogers, released as the third and final single from Sebastian's second studio album, Beautiful Life (2004). The song was released on 7 March 2005 and peaked at number 11 on the Australian ARIA Singles Chart.

Track listing

Charts

References

2004 songs
2005 singles
APRA Award winners
Guy Sebastian songs
Songs written by Guy Sebastian
Songs written by Jarrad Rogers
Sony BMG singles